Luis Luca Izzeta  (b. 1903) is an Argentinian football forward who played for Argentina in the 1934 FIFA World Cup. He also played for Defensores de Belgrano.

References

External links
FIFA profile

1903 births
1934 FIFA World Cup players
Argentine footballers
Argentina international footballers
Association football forwards
Year of death missing